The Stourbridge Railway was a small independent railway company in England which existed between 1860, and 1870 when it was taken over by the Great Western Railway (GWR).

History

Opening
The route was open in full by 1 April 1867.

GWR link to Handsworth
The OWWR had come under the control of the GWR by this time, and so in order to integrate the Stourbridge Railway with their system, the GWR constructed a link from the Stourbridge Railway at Smethwick to Handsworth Junction, which was opened at the same time, connecting it to the GWR's Birmingham Snow Hill to Wolverhampton Low Level Line, allowing trains to run into Snow Hill station. The running of the line was also taken over by the GWR.

Merger with the GWR
The Stourbridge Railway was formally merged with the GWR in 1870 after it emerged that the company's director W. T. Adcock had fraudulently issued stock.

The route today
The line still functions today as part of the Birmingham to Worcester via Kidderminster Line.

References

 John Speller's Web Pages - Stourbridge Railway
 
Early British railway companies
Great Western Railway constituents
Railway companies established in 1860
Railway lines opened in 1867
Railway companies disestablished in 1870